Sun Jiadong (born 8 April 1929) is a Chinese aerospace engineer who is an expert in carrier rocket and satellite technology. He has long served as a leader of Chinese satellite projects, and is currently the chief designer for the Chinese Lunar Exploration Program.  Sun is a member of the Chinese Academy of Sciences and of the International Academy of Astronautics.

Early life
Sun was born in Fu County, Liaoning on 8 April 1929. He enrolled in the Harbin Institute of Technology to begin preparatory courses in Russian when he was 18.
Later he transferred to the automotive department. Around the time of the Chinese air force formation, he was chosen to join the army as a Russian translator. In 1951, Sun and 29 other soldiers were sent to study aircraft engines at the Zhukovsky Air Force Academy in the Soviet Union. In 1958, Sun graduated "with highest honor" and returned to China.

Career
After returning to China, Sun served in the Fifth Research Institute of the Ministry of National Defense, conducting missile research. In 1967, he was appointed by Qian Xuesen to restructure the staff for satellite research. In addition to being in charge of the general design project for China's first satellite, he also worked as the technical superintendent and general designer for both China's first remote sensing satellite and recoverable satellite. He was also the chief designer of a second generation of special application satellites, such as communication, meteorological, and earth resource detecting satellites, as well as the Beidou-2 navigation system.

During the Cultural Revolution, Sun was appointed as the chief scientist of the Chinese satellite project.  On April 24, 1970, the first Chinese space satellite, Dong Fang Hong I, was successfully launched. On March 3, 1971, the satellite "Shi Jian I" was launched. In 1975, China's first returning satellite was successfully launched. In 1984, China's first synchronized experimental communication satellite, Dong Fang Hong II was launched. Sun was the chief designer of all of them.

He was elected Member of the Chinese Academy of Sciences in 1991.

Since 2003, he has been the chief designer for the Chinese Lunar Exploration Program (CLEP).

Awards and honours
1980 the honorary title of a working model in No 7 Engineering Industry Department
1984 the First-Class Merit Citation by the Ministry Of Aeronautics And Astronautics
1985 two special awards, among them the National Prize for Progress in Science and Technology
1999 "Two Bombs, One Satellite" Meritorious Award
2009 National Science and Technology Award
 2019 Order of the Republic

References

1929 births
Living people
Chinese aerospace engineers
Chinese expatriates in the Soviet Union
Engineers from Liaoning
Harbin Institute of Technology alumni
Members of the Chinese Academy of Sciences
Space program of the People's Republic of China
Recipients of the Order of the Republic (China)
People from Wafangdian